Hottwil was a municipality in the district of Brugg in canton of Aargau in Switzerland. On 1 January 2010 the municipalities of Hottwil, Etzgen, Mettau, Oberhofen and Wil merged to form the new municipality of Mettauertal. This resulted in Hottwil transferring from the Brugg to the Laufenburg district.

References

External links
 

Former municipalities of Aargau
Populated places disestablished in 2010